Antoine Gélinas-Beaulieu (born May 5, 1992) is a Canadian long track speed skater and short track speed skater. Born in Sherbrooke, Quebec, Gélinas-Beaulieu currently resides in Montreal. He is currently a member of the national long track team for Canada.

The 2009 World Junior Short Track Championships were held in his hometown of Sherbrooke. Antoine won a silver medal in the 1000 m and a bronze in the 1500 m race; this aided his 4th-place finish overall as a 16-year-old. Gélinas-Beaulieu was named Quebec's male national athlete of the year at the 37th annual Sports Québec Gala on December 23, 2009. At the following junior short track championships in 2010 in Taipei he won five silver medals in the 500m, 1000m, 1500m super final, 3000m relay, and the overall silver medal.

Gélinas-Beaulieu also received two bronze medals at the 2010 World Junior Speed Skating Championships in long track. He received the bronze medals in the 1500 m and the 5000 m. He also finished third overall in the competition.

Next he attended the 2011 Canada Winter Games in Halifax, Nova Scotia. There Gélinas-Beaulieu won three gold medals in long track speed skating for Quebec in the 1,500 m, 3,000 m, 5,000 m. His victories came as part of a comeback, as much of the previous season had been lost to him due to being ill from mononucleosis.

References

External links

Speed Skating Canada Profile

1992 births
Living people
Canadian male speed skaters
Canadian male short track speed skaters
French Quebecers
Speed skaters from Montreal
Sportspeople from Sherbrooke
World Single Distances Speed Skating Championships medalists
Speed skaters at the 2022 Winter Olympics
Olympic speed skaters of Canada
21st-century Canadian people